UTB may stand for:

 The University of Texas at Brownsville (formerly known as UTB/TSC)
 USCG Utility Boat
 Under the Blacklight
 Universidad Tecnológica de Bolívar
 Universiti Teknologi Brunei
 Uzina Tractorul Braşov (Braşov Tractor Factory), a Romanian producer of tractors
 United Television Broadcasting Systems
 Untribium, a hypothetical chemical element
 "Under the Bridge", a song by the Red Hot Chili Peppers
 United Television Broadcasting, a TV channel in California
 Muttaburra Airport, IATA airport code "UTB"